Finn Sture Hultgreen (born 16 October 1949) is a Norwegian politician for the Socialist Left Party.

He served as a deputy representative to the Norwegian Parliament from Nordland during the terms 1993–1997 and 1997–2001. In total he met during 76 days of parliamentary session.

References

1949 births
Living people
Socialist Left Party (Norway) politicians
Deputy members of the Storting
Nordland politicians
Place of birth missing (living people)
20th-century Norwegian politicians